Business Park Sofia  Metro Station is a station on the Sofia Metro in Bulgaria. It started operation on 8 May 2015.

Interchange with other public transport
Bus service: 76, 111, 314, 413, Sofia Ring Mall bus

Location

The Business Park Sofia Metro Station is situated near Business Park Sofia and serves Mladost 4 housing estate.

References

External links
 Sofia Metropolitan
 SofiaMetro@UrbanRail
 Sofia Urban Mobility Center
 Sofia Metro station projects

Sofia Metro stations
Railway stations opened in 2015
2015 establishments in Bulgaria